Matthew Keith Boyd (born 27 August 1982) is a former professional Australian rules footballer who played for the  in the Australian Football League (AFL).
Before joining the Bulldogs, Boyd had played for Dandenong Stingrays in the TAC Cup and Frankston in the VFL. He currently holds the record for the most AFL games played by a player recruited from the rookie draft. Boyd is the grand nephew of Australian football vendor icon Johnny Boyd, known as the Peanut Man.

Playing career
Boyd made his AFL debut against  in Round 7 of the 2003 AFL season. The occasion was not a happy one, as the Bulldogs were thrashed by 83 points, eventually finishing the season at the bottom of the ladder. He was able to consolidate a position in the senior team during 2004. Rodney Eade's arrival as coach in 2005 signalled a change in fortune for the Bulldogs; during his tenure, the Bulldogs would reach the Preliminary Final in three consecutive seasons (2008, 2009 and 2010). Boyd was one of the key players in the Bulldogs' resurgence, playing much of his best football under Eade, whom he later credited with saving his career. He wore the number 42 until 2007 when he took the number 5 from Rohan Smith who retired at the end of 2006.

In 2009, Boyd was rewarded for a strong season with selection in the 2009 All-Australian Team & winning his first Charles Sutton Medal, the Bulldogs' annual best and fairest award.

On 21 January 2011, he was announced as the new captain for the Western Bulldogs. Boyd relished the Bulldogs captaincy and continued his good form and was rewarded with his second All-Australian selection and second Charlie Sutton Medal.

Boyd retained the captaincy when Brendan McCartney took over as coach for the 2012 AFL season, and as the emphasis was on list rejuvenation (Boyd by this time was an established AFL veteran), he was used more in run-with roles. An illustrative example of this was in Round 13 against  in 2013; although the Bulldogs lost by 60 points, Boyd won his duel with Trent Cotchin, restricting the Richmond captain to 17 disposals while he accumulated twice as many disposals. A broken cheekbone and calf injury limited Boyd to 13 games during the 2013 AFL season, and at the end of the season, he relinquished the club captaincy to Ryan Griffen, who had captained the Bulldogs in 2013 during Boyd's absence.

Boyd's importance to the young playing group on and off the field was recognized with a new one-year contract in July 2014, which he signed in September. He revealed later that the pressure of captaincy and the extra media attention almost persuaded him to quit the sport altogether. The following day, it was announced that McCartney had resigned as coach due to player discontent. In November, Luke Beveridge was appointed as the Bulldogs' new senior coach and fellow veteran Robert Murphy was appointed captain the following week.

During the 2015 season, the Bulldogs' player list management had contemplated delisting Boyd along with fellow veteran Dale Morris at the end of the season. But Beveridge objected to the idea, insisting that both players still had much to contribute by way of experience. The Bulldogs announced one-year extensions for both Boyd and Morris in the lead up to the Elimination Final against , which the Bulldogs began well but ended up losing by seven points.

In 2016, Boyd was recognized for another outstanding season with his third selection in the All Australian team; he averaged 27 possessions per game with a kicking efficiency of 77 percent. In addition, his leadership in defence was crucial in a season where the Bulldogs struggled with injury, losing captain Bob Murphy to a serious knee injury in Round 3, and Jason Johannisen, Easton Wood and Dale Morris all suffering hamstring injuries at various stages of the season. Despite the shocking run with injuries, the Bulldogs managed to qualify for the finals with 15 wins.

What followed was the most memorable month in the club's history. Finishing the home-and-away season in seventh position, the Bulldogs stunned the football world with a 47-point win over the previous season's runner-up  in Perth, then triumphed in the Semi Final at the MCG against , the team which had won the last three premierships, before finally breaking their Preliminary Final hoodoo, downing premiership favourites  in an epic encounter to reach their first Grand Final since 1961. In one of the most sentimental Grand Finals in recent memory, the Bulldogs broke a 62-year drought, pulling away in the final minutes to claim the premiership and sparking a great outpouring of emotion from the football public. Boyd was rated among the Bulldogs' best players, gathering 27 disposals and rebounding from the opposition 50 seven times. Two weeks after the momentous victory, Boyd confirmed after some speculation that he would play on the following season by signing a new one-year contract.

In 2017 in the Bulldogs' final pre-season match against , Boyd sustained an accidental injury when Peter Wright made contact with the elbow to his right ear. The impact caused a tear which required reconstructive surgery. After the surgery, Boyd trained in protective headgear in a bid to be ready for the Round 1 match at the MCG against . Boyd formally announced his retirement on August 8. Boyd played the final game of his career in round 23 where he collected 33 disposals and 1 goal in a 9-point loss to Hawthorn.

Coaching career

Statistics

|- style="background-color: #EAEAEA"
! scope="row" style="text-align:center" | 2003
|style="text-align:center;"|
| 42 || 8 || 3 || 3 || 25 || 32 || 57 || 12 || 9 || 0.4 || 0.4 || 3.1 || 4.0 || 7.1 || 1.5 || 1.1
|- 
! scope="row" style="text-align:center" | 2004
|style="text-align:center;"|
| 42 || 19 || 1 || 2 || 136 || 119 || 255 || 91 || 41 || 0.1 || 0.1 || 7.2 || 6.3 || 13.4 || 4.8 || 2.2
|- style="background:#eaeaea;"
! scope="row" style="text-align:center" | 2005
|style="text-align:center;"|
| 42 || 17 || 5 || 4 || 120 || 109 || 229 || 66 || 35 || 0.3 || 0.2 || 7.1 || 6.4 || 13.5 || 3.9 || 2.1
|- 
! scope="row" style="text-align:center" | 2006
|style="text-align:center;"|
| 42 || 24 || 9 || 5 || 245 || 233 || 478 || 132 || 89 || 0.4 || 0.2 || 10.2 || 9.7 || 19.9 || 5.5 || 3.7
|- style="background:#eaeaea;"
! scope="row" style="text-align:center" | 2007
|style="text-align:center;"|
| 5 || 22 || 11 || 8 || 295 || 250 || 545 || 137 || 77 || 0.5 || 0.4 || 13.4 || 11.4 || 24.8 || 6.2 || 3.5
|- 
! scope="row" style="text-align:center" | 2008
|style="text-align:center;"|
| 5 || 25 || 5 || 6 || 315 || 314 || 629 || 133 || 94 || 0.2 || 0.2 || 12.6 || 12.6 || 25.2 || 5.3 || 3.8
|- style="background:#eaeaea;"
! scope="row" style="text-align:center" | 2009
|style="text-align:center;"|
| 5 || 25 || 15 || 5 || 328 || 394 || 722 || 120 || 90 || 0.6 || 0.2 || 13.1 || 15.8 || 28.9 || 4.8 || 3.6
|- 
! scope="row" style="text-align:center" | 2010
|style="text-align:center;"|
| 5 || 23 || 8 || 10 || 393 || 304 || 697 || 107 || 106 || 0.3 || 0.4 || 17.1 || 13.2 || 30.3 || 4.7 || 4.6
|- style="background:#eaeaea;"
! scope="row" style="text-align:center" | 2011
|style="text-align:center;"|
| 5 || 22 || 8 || 5 || 398 || 303 || 701 || 85 || 113 || 0.4 || 0.2 || 18.1 || 13.8 || 31.9 || 3.9 || 5.1
|- 
! scope="row" style="text-align:center" | 2012
|style="text-align:center;"|
| 5 || 22 || 6 || 9 || 374 || 347 || 721 || 112 || 87 || 0.3 || 0.4 || 17.0 || 15.8 || 32.8 || 5.1 || 4.0
|- style="background:#eaeaea;"
! scope="row" style="text-align:center" | 2013
|style="text-align:center;"|
| 5 || 13 || 4 || 2 || 196 || 186 || 382 || 61 || 51 || 0.3 || 0.2 || 15.1 || 14.3 || 29.4 || 4.7 || 3.9
|- 
! scope="row" style="text-align:center" | 2014
|style="text-align:center;"|
| 5 || 19 || 7 || 11 || 249 || 249 || 498 || 69 || 82 || 0.4 || 0.6 || 13.1 || 13.1 || 26.2 || 3.6 || 4.3
|- style="background:#eaeaea;"
! scope="row" style="text-align:center" | 2015
|style="text-align:center;"|
| 5 || 19 || 1 || 6 || 321 || 195 || 516 || 148 || 40 || 0.1 || 0.3 || 16.9 || 10.3 || 27.2 || 7.8 || 2.1
|- 
| scope=row bgcolor=F0E68C | 2016# 
|style="text-align:center;"|
| 5 || 24 || 0 || 1 || 407 || 246 || 653 || 161 || 49 || 0.0 || 0.0 || 17.0 || 10.3 || 27.2 || 6.7 || 2.0
|- style="background:#eaeaea;"
! scope="row" style="text-align:center" | 2017
|style="text-align:center;"|
| 5 || 10 || 3 || 2 || 133 || 97 || 230 || 57 || 16 || 0.3 || 0.2 || 13.3 || 9.7 || 23.0 || 5.7 || 1.6
|- class="sortbottom"
! colspan=3| Career
! 292
! 86
! 79
! 3935
! 3378
! 7313
! 1491
! 979
! 0.3
! 0.3
! 13.5
! 11.6
! 25.0
! 5.1
! 3.4
|}

Honours and achievements
Team
AFL premiership: 2016
 captain: 2011-2013
Pre-season premiership player: 2010
Individual
AFL Life Membership : (2017)
3× All-Australian: 2009, 2011, 2016
3× Charles Sutton Medal (Western Bulldogs B&F): 2009, 2011, 2012
Brad Johnson Best Team Player : (2016)
Bob Rose–Charlie Sutton Medal: 2007

Personal life
Boyd grew up in the south-eastern Melbourne suburb of Narre Warren and was educated at Mazenod College. He married his high school sweetheart Kate Jones in October 2007. In 2011 the couple had their first child, a daughter.

References

External links
*

1982 births
Living people
Australian rules footballers from Melbourne
Western Bulldogs players
Western Bulldogs Premiership players
Charles Sutton Medal winners
All-Australians (AFL)
Dandenong Stingrays players
Frankston Football Club players
Australia international rules football team players
One-time VFL/AFL Premiership players
People from Narre Warren